The 2023 season is Negeri Sembilan's 100th year in their history and 11th season in Malaysia Super League since it was first introduced in 2004. Also it was the 2nd season in the Malaysia Super League since relegated to Malaysia Premier League in 2018. Along with the league, the club also compete in the Malaysia Cup and Malaysia FA Cup in 2023.

Events 
On 7 January 2023, NSFC announced a new sponsor for 2023. The new sponsor is the clothing brand company Kelme. It has been informed that Kelme will sponsor NSFC for 2 years with a sponsorship value of RM1.7 million. Kelme will provide kits for the Super League, Under-23 League, President cup and Youth Cup teams starting this year.

On 8 January, the club officially announced several new signing players. Among them were Shahrel Fikri,  Tauffiq Ar Rasyid Johar, Tommy Mawat Bada, Farid Nezal, Mahalli Jasuli, Sikh Izhan Nazrel, Firdaus Irman, Hafiz Ramdan, and Filemon Anyie. The club also signed brothers from Petaling Jaya City FC, Barathkumar Ramaloo and Aroon Kumar. In addition, the club retained one import player, Hérold Goulon, and added four new import players to the squad: Casagrande, Vinicius Leonel,  Safuwan Baharudin,  and Levy Madinda. 

On March 6, 2023, Negeri Sembilan lost to JDT 7-0 at home. This defeat was witnessed by tens of thousands of NSFC fans, and it was the worst defeat of the 2023 season. The last time the team lost badly to JDT was in the 2022 season with a 5-0 defeat at Sultan Ibrahim Stadium.

Players

Current squad 

 

 

  

Remarks:
I International player. A Asian player. S ASEAN player. U23 Under-23 player. U20 Under-20 player. U18 Under-18 player.

Out on loan

Transfers

In pre-season

In mid-season

Out pre-season

Out mid-season

Pre-season

Friendly matches

Competitions

Malaysia Super League

League table

Results by round

Matches 
Match schedule source:

Malaysia Cup

Malaysia FA Cup

Statistics

Appearances and goals 
 

|-
! colspan="16" style="background:#dcdcdc; text-align:center"| Players transferred out during the season
|-

|}

Clean sheets

References 

Negeri Sembilan FA
Negeri Sembilan FA seasons
2023 in Malaysian football
Negeri Sembilan